The AIM-54 Phoenix is an American radar-guided, long-range air-to-air missile (AAM), carried in clusters of up to six missiles on the Grumman F-14 Tomcat, its only operational launch platform. 

The Phoenix was the United States' only long-range air-to-air missile. The combination of Phoenix missile and the Tomcat's AN/AWG-9 guidance radar meant that it was the first aerial weapons system that could simultaneously engage multiple targets. Due to its active radar tracking, the brevity code "Fox Three" was used when firing the AIM-54.

Both the missile and the aircraft were used by Iran and the United States Navy. In US service both are now retired, the AIM-54 Phoenix in 2004 and the F-14 in 2006. They were replaced by the shorter-range AIM-120 AMRAAM, employed on the F/A-18 Hornet and F/A-18E/F Super Hornet—in its AIM-120D version, the latest version of the AMRAAM just matches the Phoenix's maximum range. 

The AIM-54 has been used in 62 air-to-air strikes, all by Iran during the eight-year Iran–Iraq War. Following the retirement of the F-14 by the U.S. Navy, the weapon's only current operator is the Islamic Republic of Iran Air Force.

Development

Background
Since 1951, the Navy faced the initial threat from the Tupolev Tu-4K 'Bull' carrying anti-ship missiles or nuclear bombs.

Eventually, during the height of the Cold War, the threat would have expanded into regimental-size raids of Tu-16 Badger and Tu-22M Backfire bombers equipped with low-flying, long-range, high-speed, nuclear-armed cruise missiles and considerable electronic countermeasures (ECM) of various types. This combination was considered capable of saturating fleet defenses and threatening carrier groups. 

The Navy would require a long-range, long-endurance interceptor aircraft to defend carrier battle groups against this threat. The proposed F6D Missileer was intended to fulfill this mission and oppose the attack as far as possible from the fleet it was defending. The weapon needed for interceptor aircraft, the Bendix AAM-N-10 Eagle, was to be an air-to-air missile of unprecedented range when compared to contemporary AIM-7 Sparrow missiles. It would work together with Westinghouse AN/APQ-81 radar. The Missileer project was cancelled in December 1960.

AIM-54

In the early 1960s, the U.S. Navy made the next interceptor attempt with the F-111B, and they needed a new missile design. At the same time, the USAF canceled the projects for their land-based high-speed interceptor aircraft, the North American XF-108 Rapier and the Lockheed YF-12, and left the capable AIM-47 Falcon missile at a quite advanced stage of development, but with no effective launch platform.

The AIM-54 Phoenix, developed for the F-111B fleet air defense fighter, had an airframe with four cruciform fins that was a scaled-up version of the AIM-47. One characteristic of the Missileer ancestry was that the radar sent it mid-course corrections, which allowed the fire control system to "loft" the missile up over the target into thinner air where it had better range.

The F-111B was canceled in 1968. Its weapons system, the AIM-54 working with the AWG-9 radar, migrated to the new U.S. Navy fighter project, the VFX, which would later become the F-14 Tomcat.

The AIM-54 Phoenix was also considered by the Royal Air Force to be used on Avro Vulcan bomber planes as part of an air defence aircraft. This missileer conversion would have used 12 missiles onboard and an extensive modification to the Vulcan's radar.

In 1977, development of a significantly improved Phoenix version, the AIM-54C, was developed to better counter projected threats from tactical anti-naval aircraft and cruise missiles, and its final upgrade included a re-programmable memory capability to keep pace with emerging ECM.

Usage in comparison to other weapon systems
The AIM-54/AWG-9 combination had multiple track capability (up to 24 targets) and launch (up to six Phoenixes can be launched nearly simultaneously); the large  missile is equipped with a conventional warhead.

On the F-14, four missiles can be carried under the fuselage tunnel attached to special aerodynamic pallets, plus two under glove stations. As such, carrying six Phoenix missiles would necessitate the jettison of at least some of the Phoenix missiles if they were not used. The most common air superiority payload was a mix of two Phoenix, four Sparrow, and two Sidewinder missiles.

Most other US aircraft relied on the smaller, semi-active medium-range AIM-7 Sparrow. Semi-active guidance meant the aircraft no longer had a search capability while supporting the launched Sparrow, reducing situational awareness.

The Tomcat's radar could track up to 24 targets in track-while-scan mode, with the AWG-9 selecting up to six potential targets for the missiles. The pilot or radar intercept officer (RIO) could then launch the Phoenix missiles once parameters were met. The large tactical information display (TID) in the RIO's cockpit gave information to the aircrew (the pilot had the ability to monitor the RIO's display) and the radar could continually search and track multiple targets after Phoenix missiles were launched, thereby maintaining situational awareness of the battlespace.

The Link 4 datalink allowed US Navy Tomcats to share information with the E-2C Hawkeye AEW aircraft. During Desert Shield in 1990, the Link 4A was introduced; this allowed the Tomcats to have a fighter-to-fighter datalink capability, further enhancing overall situational awareness. The F-14D entered service with JTIDS that brought the even better Link 16 datalink "picture" to the cockpit.

Active guidance

The Phoenix uses this high altitude to maximize its range by reducing atmospheric drag.

Service history

U.S. combat experience

 On January 5, 1999, a pair of US F-14s fired two Phoenixes at Iraqi MiG-25s southeast of Baghdad. Both AIM-54s' rocket motors failed and neither missile hit its target.
 On September 9, 1999, another US F-14 launched an AIM-54 at an Iraqi MiG-23 that was heading south into the no-fly zone from Al Taqaddum air base west of Baghdad. The missile missed, eventually going into the ground after the Iraqi fighter reversed course and fled north.

The AIM-54 Phoenix was retired from USN service on September 30, 2004. F-14 Tomcats were retired on September 22, 2006. They were replaced by shorter-range AIM-120 AMRAAMs, employed on the F/A-18E/F Super Hornet.

Despite the much-vaunted capabilities, the Phoenix was rarely used in combat, with only two confirmed launches and no confirmed targets destroyed in US Navy service. The USAF F-15 Eagle had responsibility for overland combat air patrol duties in Operation Desert Storm in 1991, primarily because of the onboard F-15 IFF capabilities. The Tomcat did not have the requisite IFF capability mandated by the JFACC to satisfy the rules of engagement to utilize the Phoenix capability at beyond visual range. The AIM-54 was not adopted by any foreign nation besides Iran, or any other US armed service, and was not used on any aircraft other than the F-14.

Iranian combat experience

On January 7, 1974 as part of Project Persian King, the Imperial Iranian Air Force placed an order for 424 AIM-54As, later increasing it by 290 missiles that June. Of the initial order, 274 missiles and 10 training rounds were delivered for US$150 million, until the 1979 Revolution ended deliveries and left the remaining 150 missiles embargoed and the additional order of 290 cancelled.

According to Tom Cooper and Farzad Bishop, during the Iran–Iraq War AIM-54s fired by IRIAF Tomcats achieved 78 victories against Iraqi MiG-21/23/25s, Tu-22s, Su-20/22s, Mirage F 1s, Super Étendards, and even two AM-39 Exocets and a C-601. This includes two occasions where one AIM-54 was responsible for the downing of two Iraqi aircraft, as well as an incident on January 7, 1981 where a Phoenix fired at a four-ship of MiG-23s downed three and damaged the fourth.

The US refused to supply spare parts and maintenance after the 1979 Revolution, except for a brief period during the Iran-Contra Affair. According to Cooper, the Islamic Republic of Iran Air Force kept its F-14 fighters and AIM-54 missiles in regular use during the entire Iran–Iraq War, though periodic lack of spares grounded large parts of the fleet at times. During late 1987, the stock of AIM-54 missiles was at its lowest, with fewer than 50 operational missiles available. The missiles needed fresh thermal batteries that could only be purchased from the US. Iran found a clandestine buyer that supplied it with batteries, which cost up to US$10,000 each. Iran received spares and parts for both the F-14s and AIM-54s from various sources during the Iran–Iraq War, and has received more spares after the conflict. Iran started a program to build spares for the planes and missiles, and although there are claims that it no longer relies on outside sources to keep its F-14s and AIM-54s operational, there is evidence that Iran continues to procure parts clandestinely.

Both the F-14 Tomcat and AIM-54 Phoenix missile continue in the service of the Islamic Republic of Iran Air Force. Iran claimed to be working on building an equivalent missile and in 2013 unveiled the Fakour-90, an upgraded and reverse-engineered version of the Phoenix.

Variants

 Original model that became operational with the U.S. Navy in about 1974, and it was also exported to Iran before the Iran hostage crisis beginning in 1979.
 Also known as the 'Dry' missile. A version with simplified construction and no coolant conditioning. Did not enter series production. Developmental work started in January 1972. 7 X-AIM-54B missiles were created for testing, 6 of them by modifying pilot production IVE/PIP rounds. After two successful test firings, the 'Dry' missile effort was cancelled for being "not cost effective".
 The only improved model that was ever produced. It used digital electronics in the place of the analog electronics of the AIM-54A. This model had better abilities to shoot down low and high-altitude antiship missiles. This model took over from the AIM-54A beginning in 1986.
/sealed round More capabilities in electronic counter-countermeasures. It did not require coolant during flight. The Missile was deployed from 1988 onwards. Because the AIM-54 ECCM/Sealed received no coolant, F-14s carrying this version of the missile could not exceed a specified airspeed.

There were also test, evaluation, ground training, and captive air training versions of the missile; designated ATM-54, AEM-54, DATM-54A, and CATM-54. The flight versions had A and C versions. The DATM-54 was not made in a C version as there was no change in the ground handling characteristics.

 A 1970s proposal for a ship launched version of the Phoenix as an alternative/replacement for the Sea Sparrow point defense system. It would also have provided a medium-range SAM capability for smaller and/or non-Aegis equipped vessels (such as the CVV). The Sea Phoenix system would have included a modified shipborne version of the AN/AWG-9 radar. Hughes Aircraft touted the fact that 27 out of 29 major elements of the standard (airborne) AN/AWG-9 could be used in the shipborne version with little modification. Each system would have consisted of one AWG-9 radar, with associated controls and displays, and a fixed 12-cell launcher for the Phoenix missiles. In the case of an aircraft carrier, for example, at least three systems would have been fitted in order to give overlapping coverage throughout the full 360°. Both land and ship based tests of modified Phoenix (AIM-54A) missiles and a containerised AWG-9 (originally the 14th example off the AN/AWG-9 production line) were successfully carried out from 1974 onwards. 
AIM-54B A land based version for the USMC was also proposed. It has been suggested that the AIM-54B would have been used in operational Sea Phoenix systems, although that version had been cancelled by the second half of the 1970s. Ultimately, a mix of budgetary and political issues meant that, despite being technically and operationally attractive, further development of the Sea Phoenix did not proceed.
 In February 2013 Iran reportedly tested an indigenous long-range air-to-air missile. In September 2013 it displayed the Fakour-90 on a military parade. It looked almost identical to the AIM-54 Phoenix. In July 2018 as reported by Jane's, Iran started mass production of the Fakour-90.

Operators

Current operators
 – Islamic Republic of Iran Air Force

Former operators
 – United States Navy: Retired in 2004

Characteristics

The following is a list of AIM-54 Phoenix specifications:
 Primary function: long-range, air-launched, air-intercept missile
 Contractor: Hughes Aircraft Company and Raytheon Corporation
 Unit cost: about $477,000, but this varied greatly
 Power plant: solid propellant rocket motor built by Hercules Incorporated
 Length: 
 Weight: 
 Diameter: 
 Wing span: 
 Speed: 3,000+ mph (4,680+ km/h)
 Guidance system: semi-active and active radar homing
 Warheads: proximity fuze, high explosive
 Warhead weight: 
 Users: US (U.S. Navy), Iran (IRIAF)
 Date deployed: 1974
 Date retired (U.S.): September 30, 2004

See also

References

External links

 NASA Dryden Flight Research Center – Phoenix Missile Hypersonic Testbed

Cold War air-to-air missiles of the United States
Raytheon Company products
Military equipment introduced in the 1970s